Ramarajabhushanudu (రామరాజభూషనుడు ) also known as Bhattumoorthi (భట్టుమూర్తి) (mid 16th century CE) was a Telugu poet and a notable musician. He was one of the Astadiggajas (a collective title for Telugu poets in the court  of Krishnadevaraya of the Vijayanagara Empire.

Biography

According to the archeological evidence (Sasanas) available in the Kasanuru village, he was a native of Kasanuru village in Simhadripuram Mandal in Kadapa district. He was adopted to the village. He was also believed to be an apprentice of the Allasani Peddana in his youth. He was later patronised by Krishnadevaraya and his successors.
His real name was Bhattu Murti, though because he was the jewel (Bhushanam) of the royal court of Aliya Rama Raya, he later became known as Ramarajabhushanudu. He was also a distinguished musician and played the Veena.

Works
His popular works are Kavyalankarasangrahamu, Vasucaritramu, Hariscandra Nalopakhyanamu, and Narasabhupaleeyamu. He dedicated Vasucharita to Tirumala Deva Raya and Harischandra Nalopakhyanamu to Orugnati Narasaraya.

Style 
His work Vasucharitra is the most renowned for its use of Slesha, or double meaning.  These poems were later imitated by many Telugu poets including Chemakura Venkata Kavi.

Similar to Pingali Surana, he also wrote a dvayarthi (double entendre) work called Harischandra Nalopakhanam. Each poem of story narrates to life of the kings Harischandra and Nala. As he was also a musician, some of his poetic compositions had a musical flow and rhythm.

Awards and Titles 
 He is credited as gem of Ramaraya's court, and hence his name is Ramarajabhushana.

External links
 Bhattumurthy
 Telugu literature
 K.A. Nilakanta Sastry, History of South India, From Prehistoric times to fall of Vijayanagar, 1955, OUP, New Delhi (Reprinted 2002) 
 Golden age of Telugu Literature
 Literary activity in Vijayanagara Empire

Telugu people
Telugu poets
People of the Vijayanagara Empire
16th-century Indian poets
Indian male poets
Scholars of Vijayanagara Empire
Vijayanagara poets